Robert John Nay (15 November 1956 – 7 November 1992) was a competitive swimmer from Australia.  Nay competed in the 1972 Summer Olympics in Munich, Germany, but failed to reach the finals. His daughter Meagen Nay competed for Australia at the 2008 Summer Olympics in Beijing, coming seventh in the 200-metre backstroke.

He was killed in a car accident.

See also
 List of Commonwealth Games medallists in swimming (men)

References

1956 births
1992 deaths
Australian male freestyle swimmers
Olympic swimmers of Australia
Swimmers at the 1972 Summer Olympics
Road incident deaths in Queensland
Commonwealth Games medallists in swimming
Commonwealth Games gold medallists for Australia
Swimmers at the 1974 British Commonwealth Games
20th-century Australian people
Medallists at the 1974 British Commonwealth Games